Championship Bass is a fishing video game. It was released for PlayStation and Microsoft Windows in 2000.

Gameplay
Championship Bass is a fishing video game. It offers three different modes: Bass Challenge, Fishing Trip, Tournament, and Career.

Development
Championship Bass was developed by EA Seattle and Engineering Animation and published by EA Sports.

In March 2012, Championship Bass was released on the PlayStation Store for the Sony Xperia S. On August 30 the same year, the game and twenty-five other games were added to the PlayStation Vita store.

Reception

The game received above-average reviews on both platforms according to the review aggregation website GameRankings. In Japan, where the PlayStation version was ported and published by Electronic Arts Victor on November 2, 2000, Famitsu gave it a score of 24 out of 40.

References

External links

2000 video games
EA Sports games
Fishing video games
PlayStation (console) games
Video games developed in the United States
Windows games
EAI Interactive games